Cheney is a city in Spokane County, Washington, United States. The full-time resident population was 13,255 as of 2020 census. Eastern Washington University is located in Cheney. When classes are in session at EWU, the city's population reaches approximately 17,600 people on a temporary basis.

History

Named for Boston railroad tycoon Benjamin Pierce Cheney, Cheney was officially incorporated on November 28, 1883.

The City of Cheney is located in Spokane County and is home to 13,255 residents, according to the 2020 Census. Cheney is proud of its small town nature, which is enhanced by the diverse influence of Eastern Washington University, a public regional university with over 10,000 full-time students. The Seattle Seahawks of the National Football League have held the majority of their summer training camps at EWU, from 1976–1985, and again from 1997 through the 2006 training camp.

Cheney developed into the city known today because of its strong ties to education, trail riding, and agriculture. This provided a strong economic base for the community and was the result of a much larger event that took place in the United States. In 1858, the last Native American defense occurred in Eastern Washington. Because isolated Eastern Washington was an area of this Native American unrest during the early part of the territorial period, it was not until the late 1860s and early 1870s that settlers made homes in the area. In the latter part of that decade, settlers attracted by plentiful water and timber and the promise of a railway line made their homes near a group of springs bubbling through a willow copse from the bank where the Burlington Northern depot now stands.

The name of the community, originally Section Thirteen, became Willow Springs, then became Depot Springs, because of its ties to the railroad, then Billings, in honor of a president of the Northern Pacific Company, and finally Cheney, Washington in honor of Benjamin P. Cheney, a director of the Northern Pacific Railroad.

Benjamin P. Cheney was the eldest son of a blacksmith who was born in 1815 at Hillsborough, New Hampshire. At age 16, he started work as a stagecoach driver between Nashua and Keene. Five years later he had become a stage agent in Boston and soon organized an express between Boston and Montreal. He later consolidated that stagecoach line with others to form the United States and Canada Express Company, which 37 years later he merged with American Express, at which time he became American Express's largest shareholder. The only time Cheney actually visited the town of Cheney was on September 18, 1883, following the "Last Spike Ceremony" which was the joining of the eastern and western divisions of the railroad. Cheney made donations to establish the Benjamin P. Cheney Academy in the town. The railroad donated  of land so that the educational facility could be built. In 1880 the railroad was graded through the town, and in 1883 the town was incorporated with the streets laid out in the shape of a triangle with the base parallel to the tracks. The railroad tracks were not in a true east-west line, however, so the original town is askew with the map; the newer part of Cheney was built more to the compass. 

After a series of boundary changes caused by legislative acts, Spokane County was created with a permanent county seat still to be selected. Contenders for the honor were Cheney and Spokane Falls (now Spokane). Cheney received a majority of the votes, but because of alleged irregularities at the polls the election was won by Spokane Falls. When this was taken to court, a circuit court judge agreed to a ballot recount. Such recount failed to materialize, however, and the citizens of Cheney took matters into their own hands.

On a night when most of the residents of Spokane Falls were at a gala wedding celebration, a delegation of armed "Cheneyites" invaded the Auditor's office and took possession of the books, did their own ballot recount which showed Cheney the victor, and made off into the darkness with the records. The "Grand Steal" was not contested and was confirmed by a court decision in 1881.

Cheney remained the county seat until 1886 when the faster-growing Spokane Falls again brought the issue to a vote and regained the seat. From this point on, the history of Cheney revolves around the growth of the State Normal School, later Eastern Washington College of Education, later Eastern Washington State College and finally Eastern Washington University. The fierce determination of Cheney to build and promote its college was largely to regain its lost prestige over the county seat.

When Washington became a state in 1889, Cheney was able to obtain legislation establishing one of the state normal schools, mandatory under the Enabling Act, in Cheney. Its most convincing argument was that it already had the physical beginnings of a normal school in the Benjamin P. Cheney Academy.

Disagreement between legislators and governors resulted in three appropriation vetoes for the normal school in the next 25 years, but in each case, the citizens of Cheney somehow raised the funds to keep the college going until the next legislative session. The growth of the Cheney Normal School and the transformation of the frontier land into a thriving community were the basis for the changing attitudes in this area. The innovators who created the small community atmosphere were the women of the frontier. All of the energies that were once focused into making the west a home for their families were transformed into creating a vision of preferred lifestyle choices for the youth.

The Battle of Four Lakes

Geography

Cheney is at the highest point on the railroads between Spokane and Portland, and sits atop the route of gentlest gradient from the Spokane Valley to the Columbia Plateau, which was the reason for much of its early growth and railroad activity. The town is built on rolling palouse hills overlooking Channeled Scablands carved out by the pre-historic Missoula Floods to the south and east. These scablands now host "pothole" lakes and wetlands, and are home to Turnbull National Wildlife Refuge. There are numerous lakes, along with the Spokane River and Little Spokane River, that are located within  of Cheney that provide abundant recreational opportunities such as boating, swimming, water skiing and fishing.

Nearby cities and towns
 Spokane
 Medical Lake
 Airway Heights
 Four Lakes

Climate
Cheney is located in the edge of the semi-arid region leading up to the foothills of the Selkirk Mountains, where the summers are hot and dry, and winters are cold, wet and windy.

Metropolitan area

Downtown historic district
Located approximately four blocks from the EWU campus, Historic Downtown Cheney offers a traditional mix of retail and service businesses as well as government offices.  In 1999, Eastern Washington University, the City of Cheney, and the downtown business community formed a university/community partnership called "Pathways to Progress."  Pathways to Progress quickly adopted the tenets and principles of the Main Street approach to downtown revitalization, formed a board of directors, and began the process of becoming a 501c(3) nonprofit corporation. Pathways to Progress is not a registered 501c(3) nonprofit corporation.

Immediately, Pathways to Progress undertook several major projects including pedestrian streetscape enhancements along First Street (Main Street), and College Avenue.  Additionally, Pathways facilitated talks between EWU and a private developer that led to the construction of Brewster Hall, a mixed-use student residence in the downtown core.

Pathways to Progress is no longer an active organization.

Downtown Cheney has since evolved into a more traditional "university district", hosting numerous community festivals, a farmers' market, and businesses catering to the college crowd.

Cheney's downtown area is also the home of the Cheney Historical Museum which is dedicated to gathering, preserving, and sharing information and artifacts concerning the history of the Four Lakes, Marshall, Cheney, Tyler, and Amber districts of southwest Spokane County in eastern Washington. Volunteers open the museum at various times by season and by appointment as well as engaging in doing research, and preserving and caring for the collection.  Another historic site, the Sterling-Moorman House, is also under development.

Downtown Cheney is the region's gateway to the Columbia Plateau Trail and the Fish Lake Trail, both of which explore the unique geology of the Great Ice Age Floods.

Fairchild Air Force Base

Originally established as a World War II repair depot, it has transitioned over the years to a Strategic Air Command bomber wing during the Cold War, to Air Mobility Command air refueling wing during Operation Iraqi Freedom. Today, Fairchild's aircraft and personnel make up the backbone of the Air Force's airborne refueling tanker fleet on the west coast. The War Department chose Spokane for several reasons: better weather conditions, the location  from the coast, and the Cascade Range providing a natural barrier against possible Japanese attack.

Fairchild Air Force Base is also the United States Air Force's primary training facility for Survival, Evasion, Resistance and Escape Techniques (SERE). SERE is a U.S. military training program developed at the end of the Korean War to provide service members with training in the Code of Conduct, survival skills, evading capture, and dealing with being taken prisoner. It was created by the U.S. Air Force but was expanded to the U.S. Army and the U.S. Navy after the Vietnam War. The SERE school at Fairchild AFB is intended to train aircrews, special forces, and other service members who operate in dangerous areas and are thus more likely to be captured.

Demographics

The education level of residents in Cheney of the age of 25 is

 High school or higher: 95.6%
 Bachelor's degree or higher: 42.3%
 Graduate or professional degree: 13.1%

2010 census
As of the census of 2010, there were 10,590 people, 3,902 households, and 1,669 families residing in the city. The racial makeup of the city was 81.7% White, 4.0% African American, 1.3% Native American, 4.0% Asian, 0.4% Pacific Islander, 3.9% from other races, and 4.7% from two or more races. Hispanic or Latino of any race were 9.3% of the population.

There were 3,902 households, of which 21.7% had children under the age of 18 living with them, 28.0% were married couples living together, 10.5% had a female householder with no husband present, 4.3% had a male householder with no wife present, and 57.2% were non-families. 30.0% of all households were made up of individuals, and 6.1% had someone living alone who was 65 years of age or older. The average household size was 2.30 and the average family size was 2.89.

The median age in the city was 22.3 years. 14.7% of residents were under the age of 18; 48.6% were between the ages of 18 and 24; 17.8% were from 25 to 44; 12.4% were from 45 to 64; and 6.7% were 65 years of age or older. The gender makeup of the city was 48.8% male and 51.2% female.

2000 census
As of the census of 2000, there were 8,832 people, 3,108 households, and 1,529 families residing in the city. The population density was 2,161.0 people per square mile (833.8/km). There were 3,293 housing units at an average density of 805.7 per square mile (310.9/km). The racial makeup of the city was 85.28% White, 2.11% African American, 1.32% Native American, 6.34% Asian, 0.35% Pacific Islander, 1.71% from other races, and 2.89% from two or more races. Hispanic or Latino of any race were 4.35% of the population.

There were 3,108 households, out of which 25.7% had children under the age of 18 living with them, 34.6% were married couples living together, 11.8% had a female householder with no husband present, and 50.8% were non-families. 30.4% of all households were made up of individuals, and 5.2% had someone living alone who was 65 years of age or older. The average household size was 2.30 and the average family size was 2.97.

In the city, the age distribution of the population shows 18.2% under the age of 18, 41.0% from 18 to 24, 21.6% from 25 to 44, 12.9% from 45 to 64, and 6.2% who were 65 years of age or older. The median age was 23 years. For every 100 females, there were 88.2 males. For every 100 females age 18 and over, there were 85.7 males.

The median income for a household in the city was $22,593, and the median income for a family was $37,935. Males had a median income of $27,745 versus $23,375 for females. The per capita income for the city was $12,566. About 20.1% of families and 30.9% of the population were below the poverty line, including 25.4% of those under age 18 and 6.7% of those age 65 or over.

Economy

Once a booming railroad town and county seat, Cheney is a bedroom community to the city of Spokane. Many people who live in Cheney work and shop in Spokane, while over half of the student population at Eastern Washington University commutes to classes in Cheney daily. Cheney has its own distinctive economic characteristics, but its fortunes and growth are tightly linked to the greater economy of the Inland Northwest. Eastern Washington University is the single largest employer in Cheney, followed by the Cheney School District and city government. In the private sector, healthcare dominates the employment base followed closely by farming and agriculture with the principal crops being dryland graincrops like wheat, barley and peas along with a substantial amount of hay production.

Much of the growth and development has taken place in the northern part of the city, where Interstate 90 enters Cheney. I-90 is the main thoroughfare between Cheney and Spokane. Over the years this area has seen the development of several new businesses and restaurants including a new shopping center with a Safeway supermarket, Pizza Hut, Starbucks coffee, and a credit union. Holiday Inn Express recently opened a new hotel in Cheney. The city has seen residential growth with the addition of several apartments and housing subdivisions.

The city hopes to help attract more businesses and high-tech industries by installing a fiber-optic network that will eventually connect to all businesses in the city as well as developing a technology business park . The city has recently started renovating its historic downtown and has connected downtown to the university with a pedestrian-only walkway that stretches the few blocks between the two.

Eastern Washington University is the fastest-growing university in the state of Washington and has seen several new buildings built or renovated on campus, upgrades to and beautification of the campus, a new residential hall built, and a renovation of the football stadium.

Cost of living
The following cost of living indices are based on a US average of 100. A component amount below 100 means Cheney has a lower cost than the US average. A component amount above 100 means Cheney has a higher cost.

Overall, Cheney cost of living index is 94.07.

The median home cost in Cheney is approximately $202,400.

Arts and culture

Cheney Rodeo Days
Cheney Rodeo Days is held the second weekend in July each year and is a major annual event for the community since 1967. The event is put on by the Cheney Rodeo Association, an includes three days of rodeo competition held at the rodeo ground just north of Cheney. Cheney Federal Credit Union sponsors the Happy Hoofers Fun Run in conjunction with Rodeo weekend, and the City of Cheney holds the Cheney Rodeo Days Parade through the main street of downtown along with a street fair. The Cheney Rodeo features over $40,000 in prize money, rodeo stock from the National Finals Rodeo, and is a professional rodeo event that is part of the Columbia River Prorodeo Circuit which is part of the Professional Rodeo Cowboys Association, that professional cowboys can use to qualify to join the Dodge National Circuit Finals Rodeo, and potentially further qualify for a chance to compete at the National Finals Rodeo, the rodeo world championships.

Cheney Farmers' Market
Cheney Farmers' Market is held each Saturday from June 1 through September 14. Located in downtown Cheney, the annual Market provides a wide variety of regionally grown and prepared products and produce, pieces from local artisans, and hand crafted goods. The market encourages the community to get to know the local farmers and learn about local food sources. Local farmers come to the market to help the community understand how food is grown and where it comes from.

Eastern Regional Branch of the Washington State Archives
Cheney is home to the Eastern Regional Branch of the Washington State Archives, which provides archival and records management services to local government agencies throughout Adams, Asotin, Columbia, Ferry, Garfield, Lincoln, Pend Oreille, Spokane, Stevens, Walla Walla and Whitman counties in the state of Washington. Eastern Region's collections include: Local government records include those from county offices such as the Auditor, the Clerk, the Treasurer, the Board of Commissioners, and from municipalities, school districts, and other service districts. Only a small percentage of the records created by these offices are transferred to the State Archives as archival records. They are selected as archival for their value as legal and historical evidence of policy development, implementation, and effect. The transfer of records to the State Archives is an ongoing process. Some historical records remain with their originating office pending future transfer to the archives. Collections span the years from the territorial period to the present and include school census records, tax assessment rolls, court dockets and case files, photographs, maps, plats, and engineering drawings. The Archives building is located on the campus of Eastern Washington University.

Parks and recreation

The City of Cheney has a number of significant and well-maintained public parks. Currently there are seven public parks inside the city limits with land set aside for the addition of two more in the near future to accommodate Cheney's substantial recent growth. The current parks are:

 City Park - picnic and barbecue facilities, playground equipment and restrooms
 Centennial Park - two soccer fields, picnic and barbecue facilities, and a horse shoe pit.
 Hagelin Park - picnic and barbecue facilities, playground equipment, restrooms, outdoor swimming pool, tennis courts, volleyball courts and soccer fields.
 Hibbard Park - basketball court and playground equipment
 Moos Field - two baseball fields, a soccer field and restroom facilities
 Salnave Park - two soccer fields, two softball fields and a baseball field, play ground equipment, basketball court, tennis courts, restrooms and picnic and barbecue facilities.
 Sutton Park - playground equipment, restrooms and a gazebo.

Local recreation programs
The City of Cheney has a wide variety recreation programs that are available in addition to the park facilities listed above. These programs and activities are administered by a coalition made up of the city and county government agencies and local non-profit organizations. The activities in these programs range from basketball, baseball, softball gymnastics, karate, day camps, and arts & crafts for youth and children to adult sport leagues and educational and field trips for senior citizens, along with a summer concert and movie series that is held at Sutton Park. The recreation programs run by local non-profit organizations include:

 Cheney Waves Aquatic Team
 Cheney Cooperative Preschool
 Cheney Storm Soccer Club
 West Plains Little League Association
 Spokane Youth Sports Association (soccer and baseball)
 Hunter Safety Courses
 Boy Scouts / Girl Scouts

Columbia Plateau Trail State Park 

There are four access points to the trail near Cheney: Fish Lake Trailhead (Milepost 365), Cheney Trailhead (Milepost 361.25), Amber Lake Trailhead (Milepost 349.25), Martin Road Trailhead (Milepost 342). The section between the Fish Lake and Cheney trailheads is paved; the rest is gravel.

Turnbull National Wildlife Refuge

Nearby recreation opportunities
There are multiple recreational opportunities and events near the city of Cheney that include:

The Fairway's is a Par 72, 18-hole championship golf course laid out in a links style format.
Lilac Bloomsday Run - A  road race held in Spokane the first Sunday in May each year. This is the world's largest road run with over 60,000 participants every year.
 Spokane Hoopfest - The world's largest 3 on 3 outdoor basketball tournament held the last weekend of June each year in downtown Spokane. Each year about 6,000 teams comprising over 24,000 competitors participate in this annual tournament.
 Snow skiing at four different local ski areas: Mount Spokane Ski and Snowboard Park, 49 Degrees North, Schweitzer Mountain and Silver Mountain, Idaho.
 Whitewater rafting, kayaking and hiking at Riverside State Park. It is host to a unique series of basalt geologic formations in and about the Spokane River which provide the environment for excellent whitewater rafting and rock climbing.

Government

The City of Cheney's government operates under a strong mayor-council form of government. The Mayor is elected by the community at large every four years, and the City Council consists of seven members who are also elected to serve in four-year terms. The Mayor performs as the Chief Executive Officer, and the City Council performs the legislative functions.

The City Council meets every second and fourth Tuesday of the month at 6:00 PM. Meetings are conducted in the City Council Chambers in City Hall, located at 609 Second Street. An agenda of the upcoming City Council meeting is posted in City Hall on the Friday before the regularly scheduled City Council meeting. Cheney's current elected officials and key administrators are:

Mayor
 Chris Grover

City Council
 Vincent Barthels 
 Ryan Gaard
 Dan Hilton
 Teresa Overhauser
 Mark Posthuma
 Paul Schmidt
 Jill Weiszmann

The City Council makes final decisions regarding policy and fiscal matters and is assisted by a number of advisory committees that include:

 Planning Commission: A seven-member commission chosen by the City Council and Mayor that is charged with dealing with matters affecting long-range planning and urban growth.
 Parks Board: A seven-member commission chosen by the City Council and Mayor that is charged with identifying recreation needs in the community, recommending policies related to parks and recreation operations to the City Council and Mayor and reviewing proposals presented by city government staff.
 Youth Commission: The Youth Commission is composed of high school and junior high school students who advise the City Council and Mayor on the needs and issues affecting youth in the community.
 Historic Preservation Commission: A seven-member commission chosen by the City Council and Mayor that is charged with the identification and preservation of community cultural resources through the inventory and registry of historic places.

Departments and administrative staff
The actual administration of the government is operated under a city administrator who oversees several departments that include:

 Community Development Department
 Finance Department
 Fire Department
 Light Department
 Municipal Court
 Parks & Recreation Department
 Police Department
 Public Works Department

Regularly scheduled interdepartmental meetings are held to coordinate the activities of Cheney's government. Cheney's administrative staff includes:

 Mark Schuller, City Administrator
 Vacant, Personnel
 LaRayne Connelly, Executive Secretary
 John Hensley, Chief of Police
 Cynthia Niemeier, Director of Finance
 Todd Ableman, Public Works
 Steve Boorman, Light Department
 Terri Cooper, Court Administrator

State
In the Washington State Legislature, Cheney is located in the 6th Legislative District. It is currently represented in the Washington State Senate by Republican Michael Baumgartner. In the Washington House of Representatives Cheney is represented by Republican Kevin Parker in Position #1 and Republican Jeff Holy in Position #2.

Federal
Cheney is located in Washington's 5th congressional district for representation in the United States Congress. The 5th congressional district in Washington has a Cook Partisan Voting Index of R+7 and is represented in the House of Representatives by Republican Cathy McMorris Rodgers and in the Senate is represented by two Democrats, Patty Murray and Maria Cantwell.

Education

Cheney School District

The primary and secondary public schools in the City of Cheney are run by Cheney School District. Cheney public schools spend $5,688 per student in annual education costs. The average annual school expenditure in the United States is $6,058 per student. The student teacher ratio in Cheney public schools is approximately 25-35 students per teacher. The district operates seven schools and a partnership program that supports K-8 homeschool students.

Eastern Washington University

Founded in 1882, as the Benjamin P. Cheney Academy, it opened its doors to more than 200 enrolling students.

The academy became the Washington State Normal School at Cheney in 1889, the same year in which Washington was given its statehood. By the time it became Eastern Washington College of Education in 1937, Eastern was already a fully accredited four-year, degree-granting institution, offering majors in numerous subjects. The campus grew rapidly in size and program offerings in the decades following World War II. In 1961, the name was again changed, this time to Eastern Washington State College. It was increasingly evident that the region needed professionals in many fields; in response, Eastern added a wide range of undergraduate and graduate degree programs. Finally, in 1977, the state legislature changed the school's name to Eastern Washington University.

Eastern Washington University is now a regional, comprehensive public university, with programs also offered in Bellevue, Everett, Kent, Seattle, Shoreline, Spokane, Tacoma, Vancouver and Yakima.

Libraries
Cheney is served by two libraries:

 Cheney Library is a public library that is a branch of the Spokane County Library District, which is a regional network of 10 libraries with a permanent collection of over 400,000 items, and a staff of 164 employees.
 John F. Kennedy Library at Eastern Washington University is a collegiate research-level library with a staff of 42 employees. It supports the academic and research needs of a major regional university that has undergraduate and graduate students along with research and teaching faculty and the surrounding communities.

Infrastructure

Healthcare
The city of Cheney's medical and dental needs are serviced by two medical clinics and four dentists. Hospital / surgical services are handled at the three major hospitals located in Spokane.

Transportation

Major highways
 Interstate 90
 U.S. Route 2
 U.S. Route 195
 State Route 904 (Lt. Col. Michael P. Anderson Memorial Highway)

Airports

Public transportation
 Public transportation service is provided by the Spokane Transit Authority which provides three fixed-routes that serve the City of Cheney and connect it to other destinations throughout the region. Paratransit service is also provided for those whose disability precludes them from accessing fixed-routes.

Notable people

 Lt. Col. Michael P. Anderson (born December 25, 1959 – February 1, 2003) astronaut who died as member of the crew of Space Shuttle Columbia during its disastrous re-entry in February 2003 (see Space Shuttle Columbia disaster). 
 Steve Emtman (born April 16, 1970) is a former defensive end/defensive tackle for the National Football League's Washington Redskins, Dallas Cowboys, Miami Dolphins and Chicago Bears. 
 Linda Johns (born 1960) is the author of the Hannah West series of children's mysteries set in Seattle, Washington. 
 Clarence D. Martin (June 29, 1886 – August 11, 1955) served two terms as the governor of the state of Washington from 1933 to 1940 as a Democrat. 
 Launi Meili (born June 4, 1963) represented the United States at the 1992 Summer Olympics and won the gold medal in women's three-position small-bore rifle shooting at the 1992 Olympics in Barcelona, Spain. There are signs on entry ways to the city that honor her contribution to American women's marksmanship.
 Dallas Peck (1929–2005), noted geologist and vulcanologist, was a native of Cheney. Peck was the Director of the U.S. Geological Survey from 1981–1993. 
 Comic book artist and writer Todd McFarlane (born March 16, 1961) lived here for a time before achieving fame at Marvel Comics with his works on comic books such as The Incredible Hulk and The Amazing Spider-Man before going off to form Image Comics.
 Lucy Robbins Messer Switzer (1844-1922), temperance activist

Places listed on the National Register of Historical Places

References

External links
 Official website of the City of Cheney
 History of Cheney at HistoryLink
 Official website of the West Plains Chamber of Commerce
 Official website of Historic Downtown Cheney
 

 
Cities in Washington (state)
Cities in Spokane County, Washington
Populated places established in 1883
1883 establishments in Washington Territory